Parag Khanna (born 27 July 1977 in Kanpur) is an Indian American specialist in geopolitics and globalization. He is the managing partner of FutureMap, and former managing partner of Hybrid Reality as well as Co-Founder & CEO of Factotum.

Early life and education
Khanna was born in Kanpur, India. His childhood was spent between India and the United Arab Emirates before his family moved to New York City. He obtained the degree of Bachelor of Science in International Affairs from the School of Foreign Service at Georgetown University, and also a Master of Arts in Security Studies from Georgetown in 2005. In 2010, he received his PhD in international relations from the London School of Economics, completing a thesis entitled The World Economic Forum: An anatomy of multi-stakeholder global policy-making.

Career 
From 1999 to 2000, Khanna was a research associate at the Council on Foreign Relations in New York. From 2000 to 2002, he worked at the World Economic Forum. From 2002 to 2005, he was a Global Governance Fellow at the Brookings Institution. From 2006 to 2012, he was a senior research fellow at the New America Foundation in Washington, D.C.. From 2012 to 2018, he was a senior research fellow at the Lee Kuan Yew School of Public Policy at the National University of Singapore.

His other affiliations include Richard von Weizsaecker Fellow of the Robert Bosch Academy in 2017, senior fellow of the Singapore Institute of International Affairs (2012–2014), visiting fellow at LSE IDEAS (2011–2013), and senior fellow at the European Council on Foreign Relations (2011–2013) and distinguished visitor at the Munk School of Global Affairs at the University of Toronto. In 2010, he became the first video-blogger for ForeignPolicy.com. From 2008 to 2009, Parag was the host of "InnerView" on MTV.

Government service
In 2007, Khanna served as a Senior Geopolitical Advisor to US Special Operations Forces deployed in Iraq and Afghanistan.

Books 
Khanna's first book was The Second World: Empires and Influence in the New Global Order. In 2008,
Khanna authored an essay adapted from this book in the New York Times Magazine titled "Waving Goodbye to Hegemony".

In 2011, How to Run the World: Charting a Course to the Next Renaissance, Khanna's sequel to The Second World. In the book, he argues that the world is entering a “postmodern Middle Ages” in which global governance takes the form of “mega-diplomacy” among coalitions of public and private actors.

In 2012, Khanna co-authored a book with Ayesha Khanna, called Hybrid Reality: Thriving in the Emerging Human-Technology Civilization. The book presents how humanity is moving beyond the information revolution into a "Hybrid Age" in which technology is incorporated into all aspects of human life. It developed concepts such as "geotechnology" and "Technology Quotient (TQ)".

In 2016, his book Connectography: Mapping the Future of Global Civilization, was the completion of Khanna's trilogy on world order. The book argues that connectivity in the form of transportation, energy and communications infrastructure has brought about a "global network revolution" in which human civilization becomes reorganized according to cities and supply chains more than nations and borders.

In 2017, Amazon CreateSpace published his book Technocracy in America: Rise of the Info-State. It argued that the US government requires a better balance between representation and administration, explored diverse governance systems and proposed an organizational redesign for the US federal government.

In 2019, Khanna published the book The Future is Asian: Commerce, Conflict and Culture in the 21st Century, which analyses the shift in global power location from the West to the continent Asia, and comments on the growing common identity among its collective nations. He examines the reemergence of an "Asian system" after the end of colonialism and Cold War, and how Asia's collective rise impacts geopolitics, economics, and culture has shifted away from US hegemony.

In 2021, Simon & Schuster published MOVE: The Forces Uprooting Us, in which Khanna forecasts the future of human geography in light of colliding megatrends such as demographics, geopolitics, technological automation and climate change.

Criticism
In 2011, editors at The New Republic named him one of the "Most Over-Rated Thinkers" of the year, calling Khanna's book How to Run The World a "self-congratulatory anthology of clichés and platitudes". In the same magazine a year later, Evgeny Morozov was strongly critical of Khanna when he reviewed Hybrid Reality by describing Khanna as an "intellectual impostor" possessed of "contempt for democracy and human rights" and criticising his admiration of authoritarian governments in China and Singapore.

TED
Khanna has participated in multiple TED conferences. In 2009 he gave a keynote talk at TED Global in Oxford, England on "Invisible Maps." He was also a guest host of TED Global 2012, held in Edinburgh, Scotland, whose theme was "Radical Openness." He curated a session of speakers on the theme of "The Upside of Transparency" including Sanjay Pradhan, Beth Noveck, Heather Brooke, Marc Goodman and Deyan Sudjic. In 2016, he spoke at the main TED conference held in Vancouver, Canada, on "how megacities are changing the map of the world."

Awards
Khanna was awarded the OECD Future Leaders Prize in 2002. In 2008, he was named one of Esquires "75 Most Influential People of the 21st Century", and featured in Wired magazine's "Smart List". He has been honored as a Young Global Leader of the World Economic Forum and currently serves on the WEF's Global Agenda Council on Geo-economics and advisory board of its Future of Urban Development Initiative. He has received research grants from the United Nations Foundation, Smith Richardson Foundation, and Ford Foundation. He is a fellow of the Royal Geographical Society.

Bibliography
The Second World: Empires and Influence in the New Global Order, Random House, 2008. . 
How to Run the World: Charting a Course to the Next Renaissance, Random House, 2011. .
Connectography: Mapping the Future of Global Civilization, New York: Random House, 2016. , 
Hybrid Reality: Thriving in the Emerging Human-Technology Civilization, TED Books, 2012.  
Technocracy in America: Rise of the Info-State. Kentucky : CreateSpace, 2017. , 
The Future is Asian: Commerce, Conflict and Culture in the 21st Century, New York : Simon & Schuster, 2019. , 
MOVE: The Forces Uprooting Us. Simon & Schuster, 2021. ,

References

External links
 
 

1977 births
Alumni of the London School of Economics
American foreign policy writers
American male non-fiction writers
American male writers of Indian descent
American political scientists
Indian political scientists
American political writers
American economics writers
Free University of Berlin alumni
Indian emigrants to the United States
International relations scholars
Living people
Radical centrist writers
Walsh School of Foreign Service alumni